Mutya ng Pilipinas 2004, the 36th edition of Mutya ng Pilipinas, Inc., was held on July 7, 2004 in Manila. Jedah Hernandez, came out victorious as the winner of Mutya ng Pilipinas Asia Pacific International 2004. The pageant was made into a reality TV-type of competition wherein the candidates is eliminated gradually until the finals. Known for its innovation and trendsetting TV formats, ABC 5 has launched "Buhay Beauty Queen: The Search for Mutya ng Pilipinas 2004". Wherein all contestants undergo a 14-week training under the tutelage of well-known trainers and beauty experts. The winner receives 1 million pesos and will represent at Miss Asia Pacific International pageant.

Results
Color keys

Special awards

Contestants

Crossovers and repeaters from major national pageants prior to this date
 Mutya #4 Kooky Ken dela Cruz was Binibining Pilipinas 2004 candidate
 Mutya #12 Maria Liwayway Baterna was Mutya ng Pilipinas 2003 Top 10 semifinalist and Binibining Pilipinas 2004 Top 10 semifinalist

Post-pageant notes
 Mutya ng Pilipinas Asia Pacific International, Jedah Hernandez competed the following year at the 2005 Miss Asia Pacific International on April 9 in Guangzhou, China and placed 4th runner-up. 
 The Philippines' delegate to Miss Intercontinental 2004 in Huhhot, China, Jamie Fermin Burgos was appointed by a California-based Filipino-American pageant organizers. Jamie placed Top 12 semifinalist
 Mutya 1st runner-up, Eizza Rancesca Lim competed at Miss Tourism International 2004 but unplaced
 Mutya 3rd runner-up, Diana Jean Espidido competed at Miss Tourism Queen of the Year 2004 but unplaced

References

External links
 Official Mutya ng Pilipinas website
  Mutya ng Pilipinas 2005 is on!

2004 beauty pageants
2004 in the Philippines
2004